The music of Myanmar (or Burma) shares many similarities with other musical styles in the region. In Burmese, music segments are combined into patterns, and then into verses, making it a multi-level hierarchical system. Various levels are manipulated to create a song. Harmony in Mahagita (the Burmese body of music) is known as twe-lone, which is similar to a chord in western music. For example, C is combined with F or G.

Musical instruments include the brass se (which is like a triangle), hne (a kind of oboe), the bamboo wa, as well as the well-known saung, a boat-shaped harp. Traditionally, the instruments are classified into five groups called . These instruments are played on a musical scale consisting of seven tones, each associated with an animal that is said to be the producer of the tone. Each tone can be raised, lowered, or played naturally (corresponding to sharp, flat or natural), resulting in twenty-one possible combinations. The pat waing drum circle, for example, consists of twenty-one drums, one tuned to each tone in each possible combination. Similarly, the Kyi Waing, a twenty-one gong instrument is struck with a knobbed stick placed alongside the pat waing.  Western music gained popularity in Burma during the 1930s, despite the government's intervention. During the socialist era, musicians and artists were subject to censorship by the Press Scrutiny Board and Central Registration Board, as well as laws like the State Protection Law. Classical music was also introduced during the British occupation. Pop music emerged in the 1970s and was banned by state-run radio stations. However, many artists circumvented this censorship by producing albums in private studios and releasing them in music production shops. Rock music, called stereo in Burmese, has been a popular form of music since the 1980s. When the country's regulations on censorship were loosened in 2000, many pop groups emerged throughout Myanmar such as Electronic Machine, Playboy, ELF Myanmar, and the King. In August 2012, state censorship on music was officially abolished.

Traditional music

Classical traditions 
The orthodox Theravada Buddhism rejects music as being decadent, but despite this cultural backdrop, the Burmese monarchy along with the infusion of different regional music styles, created several classical traditions of Burmese music. The oldest of such influences may perhaps come from China, which shares a similar pentatonic musical scale as classical Burmese music. Other influences include Mon music (called  or "sounds of the Talaing [Mon]"), particularly in the Mahāgīta, the complete body of classical Burmese music.

A prevailing one is called , which is essentially a class of Burmese adaptations to songs accompanied with the saung gauk and come from the Ayutthaya kingdom (modern-day Thailand) during the reigns of Bayinnaung (1551–1581) and Hsinbyushin (1753–1776), which brought back a variety of cultural traditions including the Ramayana. The primary indigenous form is called .

Burmese classical music ensembles can be divided into outdoor and indoor ensembles. Today,  music is played at festivals.

Mahagita 

Translated as "great music" in Pali, the Mahāgīta is an extensive collection of Burmese classical songs called .

Folk traditions 
Burmese music includes a variety of folk traditions.

The traditional folk ensemble, typically used in nat pwe (Burmese theatre, art and festivals) is called the hsaing waing. It is mainly made up of different gongs and drums, as well as other instruments, depending on the nature of performance. The ensemble bears many similarities to other Southeast Asian ensembles, although it incorporates a drum circle not found in similar ensembles.

Hsaing waing music, however, is atypical in Southeast Asian music, characterised by sudden shifts in rhythm and melody as well as change in texture and timbre.

Popular music

Early beginnings 
Western music has gained popularity in Burma since the 1930s. Despite the government's intervention at times, especially during the socialist era, popular Burmese music has seen considerable influence from Western music, which consists of popular Western songs rendered in Burmese and pop music similar to other Asian pop tunes. Classical music was also introduced during the British occupation. Cult folk musician Nick Drake was born in Burma during British rule.

Rock music, called stereo in Burmese, has been a popular form of music since the 1980s, having been introduced in the 1960s. Pop music emerged in the 1970s and was banned by state-run radio stations. However, many artists circumvented this censorship by producing albums in private studios and releasing them in music production shops. During the socialist era, musicians and artists were subject to censorship by the Press Scrutiny Board and Central Registration Board, as well as laws like the State Protection Law. During this period, the arrival of various bands including the influential Thabawa Yinthwenge (The Wild Ones), which included lead singer Sai Htee Saing, an ethnic Shan, in 1973 paved the way for ethnic minority musicians to gain visibility in the Burmese music industry. Sai Kham Leik is a well known composer associated with The Wild Ones. Other contemporary singers were Khin Maung Toe, Kaiser, Hlwan Moe, Htoo Ein Thin, Soe Lwin Lwin, Saung Oo Hlaing, Lay Phyu, May Sweet, Maykhala, and Connie.

1980s-1990s 
During the 8888 Uprising, restrictions loosened and many artists began writing music with themes of freedom and democracy. However, after the State Law and Order Restoration Council usurped power in 1988, the Press Scrutiny Board was reformed to censor specific political and social issues, including poverty, the sex trade, democracy, and human rights. The Myanmar Music Asiayon (MMA) was established by the SLORC to further censor Burmese-produced music. Popular musicians including Zaw Win Htut and Sai Htee Saing have produced propaganda albums written by military officers such as Mya Than San.

Hip hop and rap emerged in the late 1990s and is now the prevailing genre of music among Burmese youth today.
Bands like Iron Cross, Emperor and BigBag are popular among older Burmese and certain groups of youth. There are hip-hop enthusiasts all over Burma with Burmese hip-hop artists such as Ye Lay, Sai Sai Kham Hlaing, and J-me. There are also many underground rock and metal bands such as All Else I Fail, Last Day of Beethoven, Temper Level VIII, Tha Ta Lin Chate, Idiots, Offkeys, We Are the Waste, The Last Secret, etc. but mostly producing nu-metal and metalcore. As for heavy metal, the scene is growing steadily but remains less popular compared to mainstream music. Despite very few metal bands in Burma, the metal band aficionado society is united and supportive of raw black metal, thrash metal, and death metal. Burmese cover songs (particularly from Asia) represented early pop music in the country as artists recorded and performed "copy tunes," which were reproductions of international pop songs performed in Burmese. Singers such as Min Min Latt paved the way for other artists such as Myanmar's version of Lady Gaga, Phyu Phyu Kyaw Thein, R Zarni and Sai Sai Kham Leng.

2000s-present 
When the country's regulations on censorship were loosened in 2000, new pop groups emerged across Myanmar who were able to compose, record and perform original Burmese music. Many pop groups emerged throughout Myanmar such as Electronic Machine, Playboy, ELF Myanmar and the King. In August 2012, state censorship on music was officially abolished. The only government censorship that remains on music is video censorship. Everyone can, in essence, release whatever they want. This has led many on the newly re-grouped Myanmar Music Association to grapple with the idea of forming a rating system to deal with some 'rude words' in music that may not be appropriate for all ages.

After decades underground, a small but enduring punk rock and heavy metal music scene has been increasingly visible in Burma. Modelling many 1970s and '80s classic Western punk bands and Modern Metal. Burmese punk band metal band shows a musical defiance that has not been seen before in Burma. In the German made 2012 documentary film "Yangon Calling" over a period of six weeks film-makers Alexander Dluzak and Carsten Piefke secretly filmed, as they documented the Burmese punks life, documenting everything from meeting friends and family, visiting rehearsals and filming secret concerts.

Websites that have started up in recent years such as Myanmar Xbands have given attention to the Burmese punk scene along with other alternative Burmese music. The site has developed into a hub for artists to display their music to a Burmese and international audience for free download. Most of the Talented Bands Like Last Day of Beethoven, Darkest Tears from My Heart, Fever 109, We Are the Waste are well known by others because of this website. While other Burmese punk bands like pop punk band Side Affect, turned to raising funds on IndieGoGo, to release their first album. The band just managed to raise enough funds to release their album in May 2012, shortly before their efforts fell short to international sanctions. However, other popular Burmese punk bands such as No Uturn or Rebel Riot has turned to self-release, releasing their demos on popular download sites such as MySpace and Reverb Nation.

Musical instruments

Burmese music has a wide variety of musical instruments, including the brass se (which is like a triangle), hne (a kind of oboe) and bamboo wa, as well as the well-known saung, a boat-shaped harp.  Beginning just before World War II, the piano was adapted to the performance of Burmese traditional music, modelling its technique after that of the pattala and saung. The best known performer of Burmese piano was Gita Lulin Maung Ko Ko, known as U Ko Ko (1928–2007).

The Burmese harp is of special significance. It dates back to the 9th century, though it has changed quite a bit since then, expanding, for example, from three strings to sixteen. During the Konbaung period (1752–1885), courtly musicians included Queen Ma Mya Galay, Princess Hlaing Hteikhaung Tin, Minister Myawaddy Mingyi U Sa, and King Nat Shin Naung of Taungoo. 

Burmese musical instruments are traditionally classified into five classes, called pyissin turiya:
 Kyei - brass instruments
 Thayei - leather-covered drums
 Kyo - string instruments
 Lei - wind instruments
 Letkhok - percussion instruments

Tuning 
These instruments are played in a musical scale consisting of seven tones, each associated with an animal that is said to be the producer of the tone. Each tone can be played raised, lowered or natural (corresponding to sharp, flat or natural), resulting a possible twenty-one combinations. The pat waing drum circle, for example, consists of twenty-one drums, one tuned to each tone in each possible combination, and the saing saya (maestro) sits in the middle using various parts of his hands to strike the drums to produce a melody. The kyi waing is the gong circle strung up in the same fashion and the gongs are struck with a knobbed stick and in accompaniment to the pat waing.

Kyay instruments 
Kyay or brass instruments feature prominently in Burmese music. They include:

 Linkwin (လင်းကွင်း) - brass cymbals
 Kyay nin (ကြေးနင်း) - brass gong
 Kyay naung (ကြေးနောင်) - small brass gong
 Maung (မောင်း) - brass gong
 Kyay si (ကြေးစည်) - triangular gong
 Chu si (ခြူစည်) - jingle-like gong
 Kyauk si (ကျောက်စည်) - circular brass gong
 Maung saing (မောင်းဆိုင်း) - a graduated series of brass gongs
 Khaunglaung (ခေါင်းလောင်း) - brass bells
 Thanlwin (သံလွင်) - small brass cymbals
 Pha si (ဖားစည်) - bronze drums used in Mon, Karen, and Kayah music

Kyo instruments 

Kyo or string instruments in the Burmese musical repertoire include the following:
 Saung (စောင်း) - the traditional Burmese arched harp
 Mi gyaung (မိကျောင်) - plucked zither in Mon music
 Don min (ဒုံမင်း) - plucked zither

Thaye instruments 
Thaye or leather instruments primarily consist of percussive-type drums used in folk ensembles, including:
 Ozi (အိုးစည်) - open-ended drum with a long body
 Dobat (ဒိုးပတ်) - short drum slung from the neck when played
 Byaw (ဗြော) - long drum
 Bongyi (ဗုံကြီး) - medium-sized long drum commonly used in folk music
 Bonto (ဗုံတို) - short drum
 Bonshay (ဗုံရှည်) - long drum carried with a rope round the neck
 Si (စခွန့်) - big drum
 Sito (စည်တို) - short drum
 Sakhun (စခွန့်) - double-headed drum on a stand
 Patwaing (ပတ်ဝိုင်း) - drum circle
 Chauklonpat (ခြောက်လုံးပတ်) - drum ensemble consisting of six graduated drums

Lei instruments 
The lei or wind instruments include:
 Hne (နှဲ) - oboe
 Palwe (ပလွေ) - flute
 Khayu thin (နှဲ) - conch shell
 Bado (ပတိုး) - trumpet of an animal horn or conch shell
 Khaya (ခရာ) - trumpet-shaped wind instrument
 Nyin (ငြင်း)
 Phetleik (ဖက်လိပ်)

Letkhok instruments 
The letkhok or percussion instruments are the least numerous, and include:
 Wa letkhok (ဝါးလက်ခုပ်) - bamboo clappers
 Ton wa - wooden gong or bamboo for timing and bamboo clappers

See also
 Burmese dance
 Culture of Burma
 Myanmar National Symphony Orchestra

References

External links
 WAING - a research network on music and sound of Myanmar, Myanmar music news, music related bibliography
  Hpeppoosin (Leaf Green) by Soe Sanda Tun and Saing Waing video
 Pat Waing video
 The traditional music and instruments of Myanmar/Burma
 Myanmar Traditional Music Instruments – includes pictures, and sample songs
 Burmese Music – Classical and Modern
 Nai Htaw Paing Ensemble – Traditional Mon Music
 Myanmar Traditional Musical Instruments
 Heavy-metal band Iron Cross,
 Myanmar alternative music – Burmese punk, rock, metal and indie MP3's

Burmese music